Sài Gòn Giải Phóng also known as SGGP and Saigon Giai Phong, is a Vietnamese Communist Party newspaper published from Ho Chi Minh City in Vietnam. It is published in Vietnamese, English and Chinese. Its Chinese print version uses Traditional characters, while its online version's characters can be toggled between Traditional and Simplified ones.

References

External links
Vietnamese
English
Chinese

Communist newspapers
Newspapers published in Vietnam
Vietnamese-language newspapers
English-language newspapers published in Asia
Mass media in Ho Chi Minh City
Culture of Saigon